Mongkol Namnuad (born 16 September 1985) is a professional footballer from Thailand.

Honours

Club
Muangthong United
 Thai League 1 Champions (1): 2012

References

External links
 Goal.com 
 Players Profile - info.thscore.com
 

1985 births
Living people
Mongkol Namnuad
Mongkol Namnuad
Association football fullbacks
Mongkol Namnuad
Mongkol Namnuad
Mongkol Namnuad
Mongkol Namnuad
Mongkol Namnuad
Mongkol Namnuad
Mongkol Namnuad
Mongkol Namnuad
Mongkol Namnuad